Pleurolucina leucocyma, or the saw-toothed pen shell, is a species of bivalve mollusc in the subfamily Lucininae of the family Lucinidae.

It can be found along the Atlantic coast of North America, ranging from North Carolina to the West Indies.

References

 Turgeon, D. D., W. G. Lyons, P. Mikkelsen, G. Rosenberg, and F. Moretzsohn. 2009. "Bivalvia (Mollusca) of the Gulf of Mexico", pp. 711–744 in Felder, D.L. and D.K. Camp (eds.), Gulf of Mexico–Origins, Waters, and Biota. Biodiversity. Texas A&M Press, College
  Taylor J. & Glover E. (2021). Biology, evolution and generic review of the chemosymbiotic bivalve family Lucinidae. London: The Ray Society [Publication 182]. 319 pp.

External links
 Dall W.H. (1886). "Reports on the results of dredging, under the supervision of Alexander Agassiz, in the Gulf of Mexico (1877-78) and in the Caribbean Sea (1879-80), by the U.S. Coast Survey steamer 'Blake', Lieut.-Commander C.D. Sigsbee, U.S.N. and Commander J.R. Bartlett, U.S.N. commanding. XXIX. Report on the Mollusca. Part 1, Brachiopoda and Pelecypoda." Bulletin of the Museum of Comparative Zoölogy at Harvard College. 12(6): 171-318, pls 1-9

Lucinidae
Molluscs of the Atlantic Ocean
Molluscs described in 1886
Taxa named by William Healey Dall